Indah Cahya Sari Jamil (born 16 March 2002) is an Indonesian badminton player affiliated with PB Djarum since 2014. She was the mixed doubles champion at the 2018 World and 2019 Asian Junior Championships.

Achievements

World Junior Championships 
Mixed doubles

Asian Junior Championships 
Mixed doubles

BWF International Challenge/Series (1 title, 3 runners-up) 
Women's doubles

Mixed doubles

  BWF International Challenge tournament
  BWF International Series tournament

BWF Junior International (3 titles) 

Mixed doubles

  BWF Junior International Grand Prix tournament
  BWF Junior International Challenge tournament
  BWF Junior International Series tournament
  BWF Junior Future Series tournament

Performance timeline

National team 
 Junior level

Individual competitions

Junior level  
 Girls' doubles

 Mixed doubles

Senior level

Women's doubles

Mixed doubles

References

External links 
 

2002 births
Living people
Sportspeople from Makassar
Indonesian female badminton players
21st-century Indonesian women